The Harvest Month is a 1956 Finnish drama film directed by Matti Kassila. It was entered into the 1957 Cannes Film Festival.

Cast
 Toivo Mäkelä as Viktor Sundvall
 Emma Väänänen as Saimi Sundvall
 Rauni Luoma as Maija Länsilehto
 Aino-Maija Tikkanen as Tyyne Sundvall
 Rauni Ikäheimo as Iita
 Senni Nieminen as Hanna Nieminen
 Heikki Savolainen as Mauno Viljanen
 Tauno Kajander as Taave
 Sylvi Salonen as Actress
 Topi Kankainen as Alpertti
 Pentti Irjala as the first man at sauna
 Olavi Ahonen as the second man at sauna
 Väinö Luutonen as Väinö Länsilehto
 Keijo Lindroos as Dancing man
 Mauri Jaakkola as Viktor's friend
 Severi Seppänen as Doctor
 Kaija Siikala as Viktor's first love

References

External links

1956 films
1950s Finnish-language films
1956 drama films
Finnish black-and-white films
Films directed by Matti Kassila
Finnish drama films